The Prayag–Jaunpur Passenger is a Express train belonging to Northern Railway zone that runs between  (in Allahabad) and  (in Jaunpur, Uttar Pradesh) in India. It is currently being operated with 54375/54376 train numbers on a daily basis.

Service

The 54375/Prayag–Jaunpur Passenger has an average speed of 29 km/hr and covers 107 km in 3h 45m. The 54376/Jaunpur–Prayag Passenger has an average speed of 27 km/hr and covers 107 km in 3h 55m.

Route and halts 

The important halts of the train are:

Coach composition

The train has standard ICF rakes with max speed of 110 kmph. The train consists of 16 coaches:

 8 General Unreserved
 2 Seating cum Luggage Rake

Traction

Both trains are hauled by a Lucknow Loco Shed-based WDM-3A diesel locomotive from Allahabad to Jaunpur and vice versa.

Rake sharing

The train shares its rake with  14307/14308 Prayag–Bareilly Express.

See also 

 Prayag Junction railway station
 Jaunpur Junction railway station
 Prayag–Bareilly Express

Notes

References

External links 

 54375/Prayag–Jaunpur Passenger
 54376/Jaunpur–Prayag Passenger

Trains from Allahabad
Transport in Jaunpur, Uttar Pradesh
Slow and fast passenger trains in India